The 1996 Tampa Bay Storm season was the tenth season for the Tampa Bay Storm. They finished the 1996 Arena Football League season 12–2 and finished the season with the franchise's second consecutive, and fourth overall, ArenaBowl championship.

Schedule

Regular season

Playoffs
The Storm were awarded the No. 2 seed in the AFL playoffs.

Standings

Awards

References

Tampa Bay Storm seasons
1996 Arena Football League season
Tampa Bay Storm Season, 1996
ArenaBowl champion seasons